Roger Randolph "Red" Kirkman (October 17, 1905 – November 30, 1973) was a professional American football player for the Philadelphia Eagles. He attended high school in Akron, Ohio.  He attended Washington & Jefferson College and Western Reserve University (now known as Case Western Reserve University).

References

External links
 

1905 births
1973 deaths
American football fullbacks
Case Western Spartans football players
Philadelphia Eagles players
Washington & Jefferson Presidents football players
People from Marshall County, West Virginia
Players of American football from West Virginia